Stretch Princess was a British alternative rock band, which formed in 1996.  The band consisted of Jo Lloyd (vocals, bass, and piano), James Wright (guitar), and Dave Magee (drums).  They released two albums. Stretch Princess (1998) and Fun with Humans (2002).

Their song "Universe" was featured in the first episode of the fourth season of Buffy the Vampire Slayer, and their song "Time and Time Again" was featured in the first episode of the second season of Smallville.  "Sugar" was featured in the Mary-Kate and Ashley Olsen's 1999 film Passport to Paris, as well as She's All That (1999) during the beach volleyball scene.

In 1999, "Sorry" peaked at #27 on Billboard'''s Adult Top 40 chart and was featured in the 1999 film Teaching Mrs. Tingle during the final graduation scene and the closing credits. It was also featured in the 17th episode of the first season of The West Wing during a scene at a diner between Charlie and Zoey.  "Oooh!" was the title song of the German TV show Mein Leben & Ich, broadcast from 2001 to 2009. "Sorry" and "Oooh!" were also featured in the Courteney Cox and David Arquette film The Shrink Is In (2001).
 
"Freak Show" reached #30 on the Billboard Adult Top 40 chart in 2002.

Discography
Albums
1998: Stretch Princess2002: Fun with Humans''

External links
Stretch Princess on Myspace

British alternative rock groups
Musical groups established in 1996
Musical groups disestablished in 2006